Munichburg Commercial Historic District is a national historic district located at Jefferson City, Cole County, Missouri.  It encompasses nine contributing buildings in Jefferson City. The district developed between about 1892 and 1951, and includes representative examples of Early Commercial and One and Two Part Commercial architecture. Notable buildings include the Nieghorn House Hotel (1892), Southside Barber Shop (c. 1893, 1951), Schmidt Shoe Store (1908), Southside Dry Goods (c. 1918), Milo H. Walz Hardware Store (c. 1924), Milo H. Walz Furniture Store (1936), Henry Schmidt Grocery Store (c. 1908), Central Dairy (c. 1935, 1942), and Busch's Florist (c. 1935).

It was listed on the National Register of Historic Places in 2009.

References

Historic districts on the National Register of Historic Places in Missouri
Commercial buildings on the National Register of Historic Places in Missouri
Buildings and structures in Cole County, Missouri
National Register of Historic Places in Cole County, Missouri